The 1997 Primus 1000 Classic was a 1000 kilometre endurance race for V8 Supercars, staged at the Mount Panorama Circuit just outside Bathurst in New South Wales, Australia on 19 October 1997.

It was the inaugural "1000 Classic" race, created in response to the desire of V8 Supercar organisers AVESCO to compete at the popular Mount Panorama Circuit outside of the traditional Bathurst 1000 event, as AVESCO were in conflict with the Bathurst 1000 organisers, the Australian Racing Drivers' Club. While many attempts were made to broker a peace between the two bodies, there was a fundamental chasm over the issue of television coverage with AVESCO holding a series contract with Network Ten and the ARDC holding a contract with the Seven Network. The impasse was solved when Bathurst City Council negotiated a deal with AVESCO for a separate race, to be held two weeks after the 1997 AMP Bathurst 1000, which subsequently went ahead with a field of Australian and British Super Touring cars.

The 1997 Primus 1000 Classic was won by Larry Perkins and Russell Ingall driving a Holden Commodore (VS).

Entry list and class structure

Class structure
Level 1
These were the full-time professional teams, aiming to win the race outright and holders of a 'Level 1' V8 Supercar franchise.

Special Level 1
The smaller, part-time 'Level 2' teams, who wished to run on the tyres of their own choosing.

Level 2
The smaller, part-time 'Level 2' teams, running on a Dunlop control tyre of lower, cheaper specification.

Entry list

Results

Top 10 Shootout

Race

The names of drivers who did not drive in the actual race are shown in the above table within brackets.

Statistics
 Provisional pole position (Fastest in Qualifying) - #97 Jason Bargwanna - 2:10.9216
 Pole position (Fastest in Top 10 Shootout)- #05 Mark Skaife - 2:10.0397
 Fastest race lap - #11 Larry Perkins - 2:12.3398 (new lap record)
 Winners' average speed - 157.14 km/h (V8 Supercar record)
 Most laps led - Perkins/Ingall - 80

See also
 1997 Eagle Boys 3 Hour Bathurst Showroom Showdown

References

External links
 Official race results, www.natsoft.com.au, as archived at web.archive.org
 Official V8 Supercar website, as archived at web.archive.org on 28 September 2002
 Race results, www.uniquecarsandparts.com.au

Motorsport in Bathurst, New South Wales
Primus 1000 Classic